Kenny Bartram (born August 23, 1978) is an American professional freestyle motocross rider. He is from Stillwater, Oklahoma, hence his nickname "The Cowboy" (Oklahoma State University is located in Stillwater, their mascot is the cowboy and their colors are also orange, which Bartram usually wears). Before his career in FMX, he won many Oklahoma State Series MX Races.  Out of all other riders, he currently has the most wins, 57 in all. 
Bartam has suffered plenty of injuries, including 22 broken bones, 7 knocked out teeth, a steel plate in the jaw, and a damaged blood vessel in the brain (according to himself on an interview on the podcast, "M80" on FuelTV).

In 2009, Bartram signed with KTM.

Other championships
2002 WFA Freestyle in Cleveland, Ohio - 1st place
2002 Vans Triple Crown Champ
2002 & 2003 IFMA Freestyle Motocross Champ
2003 Red Bull X-Fighters Champ
2005 Dew Tour Freestyle Moto X Champ
7 FMX World Championships
10-Time X Games and Gravity Games Medalist
2-Time Rally Car Champion

Other appearances
Bartram features as a playable character in the video game Crusty Demons. He also appeared in the MTX Nitro Circus and Rally Car Racing.

External links
 
 Bartram's bike brand

1978 births
Living people
People from Stillwater, Oklahoma
Freestyle motocross riders
American motorcycle racers